Alexandra Erika Singer (born November 18, 1987) is an American sports executive and former professional soccer player who played as a defender. She is currently the general manager of Houston Dash.

Playing career

Singer has played for Washington Freedom in the Women's Professional Soccer before she was waived during the 2010 season. Singer was signed by Perth Glory in Australia's W-League to bolster their defensive stocks and spent the latter part of 2009 playing for the Perth based side.

In 2011, she left Perth Glory for the Swedish team Dalsjöfors GoIF in Damallsvenskan. In January 2012 she transferred to the German club Turbine Potsdam and signed a contract until 2014.

In June 2014, she signed with the Washington Spirit in the NWSL.  She was waived by the Spirit on June 17, 2015.

Singer was rostered with Avaldsnes IL of Norway's Toppserien in 2015.

In 2019 Singer was a founding member of Alexandria Soccer Association's Women's semi-pro level futsal team. The team went on to the Mid-Atlantic Regional Futsal Cup that year and in early 2020 competed at the USFF Northeast Regional Championship in Atlantic City.

Executive career
In 2017, Singer joined the sports agency Octagon, where she worked as director of strategic initiatives and talent.

On August 24, 2022, Houston Dash of the National Women's Soccer League hired Singer as its general manager.

References

External links
 Virginia Cavaliers profile
 Washington Freedom player profile
 Perth Glory Women's player profile

Living people
1987 births
1. FFC Turbine Potsdam players
Washington Freedom players
Expatriate women's soccer players in Australia
American expatriate soccer players in Germany
Expatriate women's footballers in Sweden
Dalsjöfors GoIF players
Damallsvenskan players
American women's soccer players
Washington Spirit players
National Women's Soccer League players
Women's association football defenders
Virginia Cavaliers women's soccer players
American expatriate women's soccer players
21st-century American women
Women's Professional Soccer players
National Women's Soccer League executives
Houston Dash non-playing staff